Curtain is a 1920 American silent drama film directed by James Young and starring Katherine MacDonald, Edwin B. Tilton and Earl Whitlock.

Cast
 Katherine MacDonald as Nancy Bradshaw 
 Edwin B. Tilton as Jerry Coghlan
 Earl Whitlock as Ted Dorn
 Charles Richman as Dick Cunningham 
 Florence Deshon as Lila Grant

References

Bibliography
 Goble, Alan. The Complete Index to Literary Sources in Film. Walter de Gruyter, 1999.

External links

1920 films
1920 drama films
Silent American drama films
Films directed by James Young
American silent feature films
1920s English-language films
American black-and-white films
First National Pictures films
1920s American films